Killen is a surname. Notable people with the surname include:

 Bill Killen (born 1938), American politician
 Chris Killen (born 1981), New Zealand football player
 Edgar Ray Killen (1925–2018), American criminal
 Frank Killen (1870–1939), American baseball player
 Ged Killen, British politician
 James Killen (1925–2007), Australian politician
 Lou Killen (1934–2013), English folk singer
 William Dool Killen (1806–1902), Irish Presbyterian minister and church historian
 William Wilson Killen (1860–1939), Australian politician

See also
 Killens